There have been four baronetcies created for members of the Acland family, which originated in the 12th century at the estate of Acland in the parish of Landkey, North Devon, two in the Baronetage of England and two in the Baronetage of the United Kingdom.

Acland baronets, of Columb John (1644/1678)

The Acland Baronetcy, of Colum John (modern: Columbjohn, near Broadclyst) in the County of Devon, was created in the Baronetage of England on 24 June 1644 for John Acland, a supporter of Charles I. However, the letters patent were lost in the confusion of the Civil War. He was succeeded by his son, the second Baronet. He died as a minor and was succeeded by his younger brother, the third Baronet. On his death the title passed to his son, the fourth Baronet. He also died young and was succeeded by his uncle, the fifth Baronet. On 21 January 1678 he was granted new letters patent, confirming him in the title, with the precedence of 1644. Acland later represented Barnstaple and Tiverton in the House of Commons. He was succeeded by his grandson, the sixth Baronet. He sat as Member of Parliament for Barnstaple. When he died the title passed to his son, the seventh Baronet, who married Elizabeth, daughter of Thomas Dyke and built Killerton House as the family seat. He represented Devon and Somerset in Parliament.

He was succeeded by his grandson, the eighth Baronet. He died as a child and was succeeded by his uncle, the ninth Baronet. When he died the title passed to his eldest son, the tenth Baronet. He was a successful politician. He was succeeded by his eldest son, the eleventh Baronet. He was also a prominent politician as well as an advocate of educational reforms. On his death the title passed to his eldest son, the twelfth Baronet. He was a Liberal politician and held minor ministerial office under William Ewart Gladstone. He died childless and was succeeded by his younger brother, the thirteenth Baronet. He was also a Liberal politician and like his elder brother held minor ministerial office. His eldest son, the fourteenth Baronet, was also a Liberal politician and notably served as Financial Secretary to the Treasury and as Parliamentary Under-Secretary of State for Foreign Affairs. On his death the title passed to his eldest son, the fifteenth Baronet. He was one of the founder members of the socialist Common Wealth Party. As of 2018 the title is held by his grandson, the seventeenth Baronet, who succeeded his father in 2009.

Several other members of this branch of the family gained distinction. Sir Wroth Palmer Acland, son of Arthur Palmer Acland, younger son of the sixth Baronet, was a lieutenant-general in the Army. John Acland, younger son of the sixth Baronet, was a clergyman and writer on social issues. Colonel John Dyke Acland, eldest son of the seventh Baronet and father of the eighth Baronet, fought in the American Revolutionary War. Arthur Nugent Floyer-Acland (1885–1980), son of John Edward Acland, son of Arthur Henry Dyke Troyte (who assumed the surname of Troyte in lieu of his patronymic by Royal licence in 1852), second son of the tenth Baronet, was a lieutenant-general in the Army. Edward Leopold Dyke Acland (1878–1968), grandson of Reverend Peter Leopold Dyke Acland, fifth son of the tenth Baronet, was a rear-admiral in the Royal Navy. The Right Reverend Richard Dyke Acland, grandson of Reverend Peter Leopold Dyke Acland, fifth son of the tenth Baronet, was a noted clergyman. John Barton Arundell Acland (1823–1904), sixth son of the tenth Baronet, was a member of the New Zealand Legislative Council. His fourth son Sir Hugh Thomas Dyke Acland (1874–1956), was a prominent surgeon in New Zealand. His son Sir Hugh John "Jack" Dyke Acland (1904–1981) was a member of the New Zealand House of Representatives.

Acland baronets, of Columb John (1644)
 Sir John Acland, 1st Baronet (c. 1591 – 1647), English landowner, was the only son of Arthur Acland. Pricked High Sheriff of Devon in 1641, he fought as a Royalist during the English Civil War. He was created a baronet for his service in 1644, but the letters patent were either lost or did not pass the seals; a new grant was made in 1677/8 to the 5th Baronet confirming the 1644 creation. He surrendered to the Parliamentarians when Thomas Fairfax captured Exeter in 1646 and composed for his estate. Upon his death in 1647, he was succeeded by his eldest son Francis.
 Sir Francis Acland, 2nd Baronet (died 1649) was the eldest son of Sir John Acland, 1st Baronet. He succeeded his father in 1647, and dying unmarried in 1649, was succeeded by his brother John.
 Sir John Acland, 3rd Baronet (died 1655) was the second son of Sir John Acland, 1st Baronet. He succeeded his elder brother in 1649. In 1654, he married Margaret, daughter of Denys Rolle. They had two children: a daughter, Margaret (died 1691), married John Arundell, 2nd Baron Arundell of Trerice in 1675, and a son, Arthur (b. 1654), who succeeded to the baronetcy when Sir John died in 1655.
 Sir Arthur Acland, 4th Baronet (1655–1672) was the only son of Sir John Acland, 3rd Baronet. He matriculated at Exeter College, Oxford on 27 July 1669. Sir Arthur died as a minor in 1672, unmarried, and was succeeded by his uncle Hugh.

Acland baronets, of Columb John (1678)
 Sir Hugh Acland, 1st/5th Baronet (died 1714), uncle
 Sir Hugh Acland, 2nd/6th Baronet (1696–1728), grandson
 Sir Thomas Dyke Acland, 3rd/7th Baronet (1722–1785), eldest son, known on his estates as "Sir Thomas his Honour".
 Sir John Dyke Acland, 4th/8th Baronet (1778–1785), grandson, "Little Sir John", died aged 7.
 Sir Thomas Dyke Acland, 5th/9th Baronet (1752–1794), uncle, as his father known on his estates as "Sir Thomas his Honour".
 Sir Thomas Dyke Acland, 6th/10th Baronet (1787–1871), son
 Sir Thomas Dyke Acland, 7th/11th Baronet (1809–1898), son
 Sir (Charles) Thomas Dyke Acland, 8th/12th Baronet (1842–1919), son
 Sir Arthur Herbert Dyke Acland, 9th/13th Baronet (1847–1926), brother
 Sir Francis Dyke Acland, 10th/14th Baronet (1874–1939), son
 Sir Richard Dyke Acland, 11th/15th Baronet (1906–1990), son
 Sir John Dyke Acland, 12th/16th Baronet (1939–2009), son
 Sir Dominic Dyke Acland, 13th/17th Baronet (born 1962), son

The heir apparent is the present holder's eldest son Patrick Acland (born 1993).

Acland baronets, of St Mary Magdalen (1890)

The Acland Baronetcy, of St Mary Magdalen in Oxford, was created in the Baronetage of the United Kingdom on 16 June 1890 for the leading physician and scientist Henry Wentworth Acland. He was the fourth son of the tenth Baronet of the 1644/1678 creation. He was succeeded by his eldest son, the second Baronet. He was an admiral in the Royal Navy. On his death the title passed to his eldest son, the third Baronet. He was a lieutenant-colonel in the Royal Devon Yeomanry and a major in the Royal Flying Corps and Royal Air Force. He died without male issue and was succeeded by his younger brother, the fourth Baronet. He was a captain in the Royal Navy. As of 2013 the title is held by his grandson, the sixth Baronet, who succeeded his father in 1983.

Several other members of this branch of the family gained distinction. Sarah Angelina Acland (1849-1930), the only daughter of the first baronet, was a philanthropist and a pioneer of colour photography, becoming a Fellow of the Royal Photographic Society. Sir Reginald Brodie Dyke Acland (1856–1924), fifth son of the first Baronet, was a prominent barrister. Kenneth Francis Dyke Acland (1890–1975), son of Francis Edward Dyke Acland, sixth son of the first Baronet, was a captain in the Royal Navy. Peter Bevil Edward Acland (1902–1993), second son of Alfred Dyke Acland, seventh son of the first Baronet, was a temporary brigadier in the Army and served as Deputy Lieutenant and Vice-Lord-Lieutenant of Devon. He was the father of 1) Sir John Hugh Bevil Acland (1928–2006), a major-general in the Scots Guards, and 2) Sir Antony Arthur Acland, British Ambassador to the United States from 1986 to 1991.

 Sir Henry Wentworth Dyke Acland, 1st Baronet (1815–1900)
 Sir William Alison Dyke Acland, 2nd Baronet (1847–1924)
 Sir William Henry Dyke Acland, 3rd Baronet (1888–1970)
 Sir Hubert Guy Dyke Acland, 4th Baronet (1890–1978)
 Sir Antony Guy Acland, 5th Baronet (1916–1984)
 Sir (Christopher) Guy (Dyke) Acland, 6th Baronet (born 1946)

The heir apparent is the present holder's son Alexander John Dyke Acland, (born 1973), an education consultant and founder of the New Edinburgh Orchestra.

Acland baronets, of Fairfield (1818)

The Palmer-Acland, later Fuller-Palmer-Acland Baronetcy, of Fairfield in the County of Somerset, was created in the Baronetage of the United Kingdom on 9 December 1818 for John Palmer-Acland. He was the son of a younger son of the sixth Baronet of the 1644/1678 creation. The second Baronet assumed the additional surname of Fuller. The title became extinct on his death in 1871.

 Sir John Palmer-Acland, 1st Baronet (1756–1831)
 Sir Peregrine Palmer Fuller-Palmer-Acland, 2nd Baronet (1789–1871)

Notes

References
 Kidd, Charles, Williamson, David (editors). Debrett's Peerage and Baronetage (1990 edition). New York: St Martin's Press, 1990,

External links
 Biography of John Barton Arundell Acland

Baronetcies in the Baronetage of England
Baronetcies in the Baronetage of the United Kingdom
Extinct baronetcies in the Baronetage of the United Kingdom
1644 establishments in England
1818 establishments in the United Kingdom
Acland family